Muggs Presents Soul Assassins II is the second studio album by American hip-hop collective Soul Assassins. It was released on October 3, 2000, via RuffLife Records. Recording sessions took place at The Cutting Room, at Battery Studios, at Greenstreet Studios and at D&D Studios in New York, at PatchWerk Recording Studios in Atlanta, at Soul Assassins Studios in Los Angeles, and at CMO Greens Studios. Production was primarily handled by DJ Muggs, with three tracks produced by The Alchemist and one by DJ Khalil. The album includes features with Kool G Rap, Infamous Mobb's Godfather Pt. III, Xzibit, King T, GZA, Goodie Mob, Kurupt, Screwball's Hostyle, Self Scientific, Krondon, Phenam a.k.a. Don Krisis, Ras Kass, Dilated Peoples, Roscoe, Cypress Hill and Everlast.

Track listing

Personnel
Larry "Muggs" Muggerud – mixing, arranger
Troy Staton – mixing, recording
Brian "Big Bass" Gardner – mastering
Mark "Mr. Cartoon" Machado – design
Estevan "Scandalous" Oriol – photography
Paul D. Rosenberg – management
Theo Sedlmayr – management, legal
Tracy McNew – project coordinator
Mike Heron – A&R (tracks: 1, 7)

Charts

References

External links

2000 albums
Sequel albums
DJ Muggs albums
Soul Assassins albums
Albums produced by DJ Muggs
Albums produced by DJ Khalil
Albums produced by the Alchemist (musician)